Deh-e Hajji Mirza Khan (also Romanized as Deh-e Ḩājjī Mīrzā Khān; also known as Ḩājjī Mīrzā Khān) is a village in Jahanabad Rural District, in the Central District of Hirmand County, Sistan and Baluchestan Province, Iran. At the 2006 census, its population was 196, in 36 families.

References 

Populated places in Hirmand County